The 1991 USAC FF2000 Championship was the second season of the series. The series was sanctioned by the United States Auto Club and ran races in California and Arizona. Craig Taylor won the championship in a Swift DB-6.

Race calendar and results

Final standings

References

U.S. F2000 National Championship seasons
1991 in American motorsport